Land's End Observatory is a ranger observatory on the rim of Grand Mesa in Colorado. It is accessible from the Grand Mesa Scenic and Historic Byway via Land's End Road,
which is about half paved and half gravel. The observatory is about 10 miles west of Colorado State Highway 65.
Land's End Road descends as an all-gravel road from the observatory down to U.S. Route 50,
and the observatory can be accessed from that direction as well.

The observatory was built by the United States Forest Service
and the Works Progress Administration in 1936-37, with some assistance from two 
Civilian Conservation Corps (CCC) side camps.

A large viewing area outside the building provides a panoramic view of western Colorado and eastern Utah. As of 2022, the observatory building itself is closed and boarded up.

From the U. S. Forest Service sign outside the building:

You have reached Land's End Observatory
on Colorado's highest mesa, the Grand
Mesa, 10,500 feet above sea level. Built in
1936-37 by the United States Forest Service
and the Works Progress Administration
(WPA), the observatory reflects the rustic
style of architecture found in public
buildings throughout the national parks and
forests. It is marked by simplicity and
craftsmanship, appearing to grow out of the
earth rather than intrude upon it. Basalt
stones were selected from the mesa and
carefully fitted together to form the walls
and terrace. Wood shingles were hand-
sawn. The original, handcrafted woodwork
can still be found inside. Most of the WPA
workers who toiled here during the Great
Depression are unknown, the observatory
remains their legacy.

Land's End Road was once known as the
Veterans' Road. When the Great Depression
left many World War I veterans unemployed,
President Roosevelt responded by opening
the already created Civilian Conservation
Corps (CCC) to include them. Thus, between
June 1933 and May 1934, the 200 veterans
who were brought to Land's End camp
completed 9.2 miles of road. They were paid
a dollar a day for their work. Ranging in age
from thirty-three to fifty-five, the veterans
were hailed as "a remarkable group of men,
skilled in almost every imaginable trade."
They lived in army tents roughly eleven
miles below the mesa rim while clearing the
brush for the road. The toughest part of the
Land's Ends Road, from the Wild Road
Picnic Area to the rim, was completed over
the next two summers by Civil Service
machine operators and a few civilian
workers hired by the United States Forest
Service. "Built the whole road," said the
project engineer, "blasting and all, without
injuries."

References

External links

Grand Mesa National Forest - official site with visiting information
 - extensive detail on the building

Government buildings on the National Register of Historic Places in Colorado
Buildings and structures in Mesa County, Colorado
Tourist attractions in Mesa County, Colorado
Rustic architecture in Colorado
Civilian Conservation Corps in Colorado
Works Progress Administration in Colorado
National Register of Historic Places in Mesa County, Colorado
1937 establishments in Colorado